Reece Dinsdale (born 6 August 1959) is an English actor and director of stage, film and television. He is a Huddersfield Town fan. In 2017 he became a patron of the Square Chapel, an arts centre in Halifax. He is also an honorary patron of The Old Courts multi-arts centre in Wigan

Acting career

Dinsdale trained at the Guildhall School of Music and Drama from 1977 until 1980. After initially working in theatre in Exeter, Nottingham, Birmingham and at the Edinburgh Festival, Dinsdale got his first TV role in the Granada thriller Knife Edge in 1981. He followed this up by appearing in Out on the Floor a single drama for the BBC in 1982. This led to him being cast as Albert in Agatha Christie's Partners in Crime series for ITV in 1982.

More theatre followed with Beethoven's Tenth with Peter Ustinov at the Vaudeville Theatre, London and the highly acclaimed Red Saturday at the Royal Court. He played Jimmy Kemp in Threads (1984), a-soon-to-be-father and husband caught up in a nuclear attack on Sheffield. 1984 also saw Dinsdale appearing in one of his first feature films, Alan Bennett's A Private Function, and the TV movie Winter Flight opposite Nicola Cowper.

Glamour Night, another single drama for the BBC followed in 1984 before Dinsdale was cast as Matthew Willows in the British sitcom Home to Roost written by Eric Chappell and co-starring John Thaw. Dinsdale played Thaw's unruly teenage son Matthew who comes to live with his estranged father after his mother throws him out. The show ran for four series between 1985 and 1990.

Interspersed with this were many appearances on stage, including the award-winning play Observe the Sons of Ulster Marching Towards the Somme at the Hampstead Theatre, London, in 1986, Woundings and Don Carlos at the Royal Exchange Theatre, Manchester, and Old Year's Eve at the Royal Shakespeare Company. On television he had leading roles in the three-part series Take Me Home, and The Attractions, and the single drama Coppers opposite Tim Roth. He also played Fearnot in Jim Henson's "The Storyteller" which aired 26 October 1987.

Dinsdale played the leading role of Jack Rover in Wild Oats in the inaugural production at the newly built West Yorkshire Playhouse in 1990. He then appeared in Young Catherine, a miniseries in which he played the Grand Duke Peter. He then appeared at the National Theatre in David Hare's Racing Demon.

From 1990 to 1992 he co-starred in Haggard, a comedy set in the late 18th century. In 1994, he played the leading role in ID, a British feature film charting the demise of a police officer who goes undercover to root out a firm of football hooligans. Based on a true story, Dinsdale won the International Critics Award for best actor at the Geneva Film Festival.

Dinsdale has continued to play leading roles on both stage and screen. Highlights include two series of Thief Takers in which he played the central role of Charlie Scott, and Kenneth Branagh's film of Hamlet in which he played Guildenstern opposite Timothy Spall's Rosencrantz. He guested in Spooks, Life on Mars, Murder in Mind, Silent Witness, and many others.

Dinsdale starred opposite Julie Walters in the ITV drama Ahead of the Class and played Robert in  Conviction for the BBC (directed by Marc Munden). He starred in two series of The Chase (also for the BBC) and in two thrillers for ITV, Love Lies Bleeding and Midnight Man.

In 2008, he joined the cast of Coronation Street to play the ill-fated Joe McIntyre, leaving of his own volition in February 2010. Since then he filmed leading guest roles in Waterloo Road, Taggart and Moving On. He played Doctor Wengel in Ibsen's The Lady From the Sea at the Royal Exchange Theatre, Manchester. In 2012 he appeared in the feature film The Knife That Killed Me. In 2013, Dinsdale played the role of Walter Harrison in James Graham's smash hit play This House on the Olivier stage at the National Theatre - directed by Jeremy Herrin. In 2014, he played Alan Bennett in Bennett's autobiographical play Untold Stories at the West Yorkshire Playhouse.

In 2015 Dinsdale played the central role of George Jones in Headlong's national tour of Sir David Hare's play The Absence of War, once again directed by Jeremy Herrin. In October 2015 Dinsdale played the title role in Shakespeare's Richard III at The West Yorkshire Playhouse for director Mark Rosenblatt. He has an extensive list of BBC Radio Drama credits and, in 2014, he was awarded a Yorkshire Award for Services to Arts and Entertainment. In 2015, he became the first actor to be named Associate Artist at The West Yorkshire Playhouse. In 2017, Dinsdale was made a patron of the Square Chapel Arts Centre in Halifax.

In 2020, Dinsdale joined the ITV soap opera Emmerdale playing the villainous Paul Ashdale. Dinsdale left the soap after just a year in 2021 when his character was killed off in an explosion.

Directing

In January 2012 Dinsdale directed his first drama for television; a 45-minute single drama called "The Crossing" starring Lee Boardman, Ramona Marquez and Susie Blake, in the Secrets and Words series for BBC1. In July and August 2014 he directed the episode "Madge" in the Moving On series starring Hayley Mills, Kenneth Cranham and Peter Egan, again for BBC1.

In May 2015, Dinsdale completed his third drama for BBC Television, "Scratch", starring Will Ash and Chris Coghill, once again for the Moving On series. Dinsdale thereafter directed a fourth TV drama, again in the Moving On series, for Jimmy McGovern: "Eighteen", a story about the attempted deportation of an Afghan youth back to his native Kabul, starring Antonio Aakeel and Rosie Cavaliero. The series was aired in November 2016. In 2017, Dinsdale directed Sue Johnston in "Lost" by Shaun Duggan for the Moving On series.
He has directed several episodes of Emmerdale and announced in spring 2022 that he is to direct episodes of Coronation Street.

Writing
In 2009, Dinsdale wrote the short film Imaginary Friend which was subsequently filmed and stars Maxine Peake and Zara Turner. The film premiered on 8 May 2010 at the 360/365 Film Festival in New York City.

Credits (incomplete)

 2020–2021  Emmerdale (ITV)
 2017  The Fall of the Master Builder (West Yorkshire Playhouse)
 2015  Richard III (West Yorkshire Playhouse)
 2015  The Absence of War (Headlong theatre tour)
 2014  Untold Stories (West Yorkshire Playhouse)
 2013  This House (National Theatre)
 2012  The Knife That Killed Me (Green Screen Productions feature film)
 2011  Moving On (LA Productions for BBC1)
 2011  Waterloo Road (BBC TV)
 2010  The Lady From The Sea (Theatre at the Royal Exchange, Manchester)Taggart (STVITV)
 2009  Acid Burn (Red Productions short film)
 2008–2010  Coronation Street (ITV)
 2008  Silent Witness (BBC TV)Midnight Man (ITV)
 2007  The Chase (BBC)
 2006  Life on Mars (BBC TV)Dalziel and Pascoe episode "The Cave Woman" (BBC TV)The Chase (BBC TV)
 2006  Love Lies Bleeding (ITV)
 2004  Ahead of the Class (ITV)The Trouble with George (BBC)Conviction (BBC TV)Rabbit on the Moon (Headgear Films feature film)
 2003  Spooks (BBC TV)
 2002  Born and Bred (BBC TV)
 2001  The Investigation (Canadian TV/BBC)
 2000  Murder in Mind (BBC TV)In Deep (BBC)Visiting Mr. Green (West Yorkshire Playhouse)
 1999  Family Fortunes (King's Head Theatre)
 1998  Love You, Too (Bush Theatre)
 1997  Romance and Rejection, Feature Film
 1996  Thief Takers (second series) (ITV)Hamlet (Fishmonger Films feature film)China (Channel 4 short film)
 1995  Bliss (ITV)Thief Takers (ITV)
 1994  Morning and Evening (Hampstead Theatre)Mirandolina (Lyric Hammersmith theatre)ID (Parallax Pictures feature film)
 1993  A Going Concern (Hampstead Theatre)Report Writing (Video Arts Ltd. instructional video)
 1992  Full Stretch (ITV)Revengers Tragedy (West Yorkshire Playhouse)
 1991  Racing Demon (National Theatre)Playboy of the Western World (West Yorkshire Playhouse)Young Catherine (American/Canadian TV mini-series)
 1990  Haggard (ITV)Wild Oats (West Yorkshire Playhouse)
 1989  Boys Mean Business (Bush Theatre)Home to Roost (series 4) (ITV)The Attractions (BBC)
 1988  Rhinoceros (Nuffield Theatre, Southampton)Take Me Home (BBC TV)
 1987  Old Years Eve (Royal Shakespeare Company)Don Carlos (Theatre at the Royal Exchange, Manchester)Coppers (BBC)Home to Roost (series 3) (ITV)
 1986  Woundings (Theatre at the Royal Exchange, Manchester)The Storyteller (Channel 4)Observe the Sons of Ulster Marching Towards the Somme (Hampstead Theatre)Home to Roost (series 2) (ITV)
 1985  Bergerac (S4E7 "The Tennis Racket" BBC TV)Robin of Sherwood (ITV)Home To Roost (ITV)
 1984  Glamour Night (BBC)Minder Series 4, Ep 9, Willesden Suite. (ITV)A Private Function (Handmade Films feature film)Winter Flight (Channel 4)Threads (BBC TV)
 1983–1984  Red Saturday (Royal Court Theatre)
 1983  Beethoven's Tenth (Vaudeville Theatre)
 1982  The Secret Adversary (ITV)Agatha Christie's Partners in Crime (ITV)Out on the Floor (BBC)
 1981  Knife Edge (ITV)
 1980–1981   Exeter Northcott TheatreNottingham PlayhouseBirmingham Repertory Theatre

References

External links

1959 births
Living people
People from Normanton, West Yorkshire
Actors from Wakefield
English male stage actors
English male soap opera actors
English television directors
English soap opera writers
Alumni of the Guildhall School of Music and Drama
Male actors from Yorkshire